BeHafizh is a mobile application to assist in the effort to memorize Qur'anic verses. The software runs on the Android operating system.

This application was made by a team from Gadjah Mada University (UGM) consisting of Farid Amin Ridwanto, Rian Adam Rajagede and Alfian Try Putranto in order to participate in the National Student Musabaqoh Tilawatil Quran (MTQ) held at University of Indonesia (UI) on 1- August 8, 2015. This application then won a gold medal in the branch of Computer Application Design in the competition.

Features

Audio Player 
Audio player, paragraph can be played repeatedly, with pause, and can be done on a certain range of Quranic verses.

Memorization Test 
Memorization testing continues users to improve their memorization.
Memorization Recorders improves user's ability to recite Quran.

Colour indicators

Achievements

Reminders

References 

Islam articles needing attention
Mobile applications